Culham Court is a Grade II listed house in Culham, Oxfordshire, England.

History
It was built in the mid-18th century, the south front in about 1816, and with 20th-century alterations.

It was originally called the Old Vicarage and is said to have been built for Benjamin Kennicott, Vicar of Culham (1753-83) in about 1758.

References

Grade II listed buildings in Oxfordshire
Grade II listed houses
South Oxfordshire District
Clergy houses in England